U of U may refer to:

 University of Ulster in Northern Ireland
 University of Utrecht, alternatively known as Utrecht University, in the Netherlands
 University of Utah in the United States

See also
 UU (disambiguation)